Karl von Thun und Hohenstein was an Austrian officer who was notable for being the main Austrian commander at the Battle of Blumenau of the Austro-Prussian War.

Biography
Karl was born on January 24, 1803, in Vienna as the son of landowner Count Joseph Johann Anton von Thun und Hohenstein (1767–1810) and Countess Eleonore von Thun und Hohenstein, née Fritsch (1775–1834), and younger brother of politician Joseph Matthias von Thun und Hohenstein (1794 –1863).

Count Thun began his military career in 1820 as a cadet in the cavalry and became a second lieutenant in 1821, a first lieutenant in 1826 and switched to the infantry in 1831 as a captain-lieutenant. In 1840 he became a major and in February 1848, to colonel and commander of the 3rd Infantry Regiment, with whom he took part in practically all battles of the First Italian War of Independence and as a major general and brigadier in the Hungarian Revolution of 1848 in the battles of Komárom and Temesvár. In 1850, he acted for a few months as a fortress commander in Budapest and shortly retired for a bit before returning as a brigadier in 1852. In 1854, he became a Field Marshal Lieutenant and General in Opava.

In the Second Italian War of Independence, he commanded the 15th Army Corps, which was newly formed to defend the coast, but was not deployed. He was subsequently commander of the VIII Corps in Italy. He was available again at the end of 1860 and from 1861 he served in Trieste as troop commander for the coast. In August 1862 he became commander of II Corps and commanding general for Lower and Upper Austria, Salzburg and Styria in Vienna. In the Austro-Prussian War in Bohemia, he led his corps under Feldzeugmeister Ludwig Benedek, which was involved in heavy fighting in the Swiepwald against Prussia. Hohenstein himself was slightly wounded in the Battle of Königgrätz. He was then available again but he finally retired in 1867 with the rank of Feldzeugmeister.

Karl von Thun und Hohenstein received the Order of the Iron Crown, III Class in 1848 and in 1867 that of the 1st class. In 1849 he became a Knight of the Order of Leopold. In 1857, he became the owner of Infantry Regiment 29, 1859 Privy Council.

Karl later died on January 16, 1876, at Trieste at the age of 72.

He had been married to Johanna née Freiin von Koller (1809–1891) since March 7, 1833. The marriage remained childless.

References

1803 births
1876 deaths
People of the First Italian War of Independence
People of the Second Italian War of Independence
People of the Austro-Prussian War
Military personnel from Vienna
Thun und Hohenstein